Rodrigo Zelaya (born 12 June 1968) is a retired Chilean athlete who specialised in the javelin throw. He twice represented his country at World Championships, in 1991 and 1993, without qualifying for the final. In addition, he won multiple medals on regional level.

His personal best of 77.28 metres (Santiago de Chile 1998) is a former national record.

Competition record

References

1968 births
Living people
Chilean male javelin throwers
Athletes (track and field) at the 1991 Pan American Games
Athletes (track and field) at the 1995 Pan American Games
Pan American Games competitors for Chile
World Athletics Championships athletes for Chile
South American Games silver medalists for Chile
South American Games medalists in athletics
Competitors at the 1994 South American Games
20th-century Chilean people